Khalil Mahalleh (also Romanized as Khalīl Maḩalleh) is a village in Gil Dulab Rural District, in the Central District of Rezvanshahr County, Gilan Province, Iran. At the 2006 census, its population was 250, in 68 families.

References 

Populated places in Rezvanshahr County